The 2009 Nevada Wolf Pack football team represented the University of Nevada, Reno in the 2009 NCAA Division I FBS football season. Nevada competed as a member of the Western Athletic Conference (WAC). The Wolf Pack were led by Chris Ault in his 25th overall and 6th straight season since taking over as head coach for the third time in 2004. They played their home games at Mackay Stadium. The Wolf Pack finished the regular season 8–4 and 7–1 in the WAC, good enough for second place in the conference behind Boise State. They lost to SMU in the Hawaii Bowl.

Schedule

Game summaries

at Notre Dame

at Colorado State

Missouri

UNLV

Louisiana Tech

at Utah State

Idaho

Hawaii

at San Jose State

Fresno State

at New Mexico State

at Boise State

vs. SMU

References

Nevada
Nevada Wolf Pack football seasons
Nevada Wolf Pack football